David Joseph McGuinty  (born February 25, 1960) is a Canadian lawyer and politician who has served as the Member of Parliament for Ottawa South since 2004. He currently chairs the National Security and Intelligence Committee of Parliamentarians, an executive agency allowing legislator oversight of the Canadian intelligence community. A member of the Liberal Party of Canada, he has been elected or reelected seven times, most recently in the 2021 federal elections.

McGuinty is the brother of former Ontario Premier Dalton McGuinty (born 1955) and the son of former Member of Provincial Parliament (MPP) Dalton McGuinty Sr. (1926–1990).

Early life
David McGuinty was born and raised in Ottawa, Ontario in a family of twelve. His parents are politician and professor Dalton McGuinty, Sr. and full-time nurse Elizabeth McGuinty (née Pexton). Being the son of a Francophone mother and an Anglophone father, McGuinty is bilingual. He earned a Diploma in Agriculture from the Kemptville College of Agriculture, a Bachelor of Arts in English Literature at the University of Ottawa, specialized diplomas in Civil and Comparative Law at Université de Sherbrooke in Quebec, a Bachelor of Laws at the University of Ottawa, and finally a Master of Laws at the London School of Economics and Political Science.

An environmental lawyer by profession, he has long been closely involved in Liberal politics. He was chosen to serve as president and chief executive officer (CEO) of the Prime Minister's National Round Table on the Environment and the Economy, a government think-tank concerned with sustainable development.

Personal life
McGuinty is the son of former Ontario MPP Dalton McGuinty Sr., and the brother of former Ontario Premier Dalton McGuinty. He is married to Brigitte Bélanger and has four children.

Political career

Elections

In government (2004-2006)
While not invited to join Paul Martin's Cabinet, McGuinty served on the House of Commons Standing Committee on the Environment and Sustainable Development. He also served as chairman of the Liberal Party's National Capital Region Caucus.

In opposition (2006-2015)

On May 30, 2006, interim Liberal leader Bill Graham appointed McGuinty as the Official Opposition critic for Transport.

In the 2006 Liberal leadership contest, McGuinty endorsed the candidacy of Michael Ignatieff.

With the election of Stephane Dion as leader of the Liberal Party McGuinty became the critic for Environment in January 2007.

With the appointment of Michael Ignatieff as leader of the party, McGuinty was named Environment and Energy critic when Ignatieff announced his shadow cabinet on January 22, 2009. In September 2010, McGuinty was promoted to the role of Opposition House Leader.

Following the resignation of Michael Ignatieff, Interim leader Bob Rae named McGuinty as the Liberal Party's Critic for Natural Resources in June 2011, a demotion from his previous position as Opposition House Leader.

Leadership aspirations
As the younger brother of former Ontario Premier Dalton McGuinty, David McGuinty has been rumoured to be a potential leadership candidate at some point.

In 2008, following the failed leadership of Stephane Dion and his pending resignation, McGuinty was considered a potential candidate to succeed him but announced in November 2008, that he would not seek the leader and instead endorsed Michael Ignatieff, Dion later appointed him as the critic for International Trade.

In 2011, when Ignatieff led the Liberal Party to their worst result in its history, McGuinty's name was again mentioned as a possible candidate to succeed Ignatieff.

At the Liberal Party's biennial convention in January 2012, McGuinty announced he was considering a bid for the leadership of the party and that he would make his decision over the coming months.  However, on November 15, 2012, McGuinty confirmed he would not be seeking the Liberal leadership.

International work
In 2012 McGuinty was elected to head the Canadian chapter of an international alliance of lawmakers, Globe International, that presses governments to address global environment and economy challenges. He received all-party support to become the president of Globe Canada on June 12.

In 2012 McGuinty was invited by the National Democratic Institute to join their Pre-Election Assessment Mission to Ukraine.

Controversy

Anti-Alberta comments
On November 20, 2012, following a meeting of the Natural Resources Committee, McGuinty stated, among other things, that Conservative MPs were "shilling" for the oil and gas industry, did not belong in the national legislature, and should "go back to Alberta."

The Conservative response was critical, as exemplified by Prime Minister Stephen Harper who said: "I find it shameful, I guess not surprising, but shameful, that 30 years after the National Energy Program, these anti-Alberta attitudes are so close to the surface in the Liberal party." Interim leader Bob Rae apologized on behalf of the Liberal Party and said McGuinty was away on family business for the following week.

The following day McGuinty resigned as Natural Resources critic. He apologized saying, "As member of Parliament for Ottawa South, I would like to unreservedly and unequivocally apologize for comments which I made with respect to parliamentary colleagues from the province of Alberta. My words in no way reflect the views of my party or leader, and I offer my apology to them as well as my colleagues from Alberta. I hold all parliamentarians in high esteem, and I regret my choice of words, as I can understand the offence they have caused."

Attendance record
In early 2014, McGuinty was accused of being a "part-time" Member of Parliament by the Conservative Riding Association, who were subsequently unable to explain how they calculated McGuinty's time in the House of Commons, given that the House does not keep attendance records.

Electoral record

|- bgcolor="white"
|align="right" colspan=3|Difference
|align="right"|4,124
|align="right"|6.71
|align="right"|-2.29
|- bgcolor="white"
|align="right" colspan=3|Rejected Ballots
|align="right"|298
|align="right"|0.5
|align="right"|-0.1
|- bgcolor="white"
|align="right" colspan=3|Turnout
|align="right"|61,808
|align="right"|71.71
|align="right"|+2.00
|- bgcolor="white"

|- bgcolor="white"
|align="right" colspan=3|Difference
|align="right"|5,334
|align="right"|8.95
|align="right"|-17.9
|- bgcolor="white"
|align="right" colspan=3|Rejected Ballots
|align="right"|361
|align="right"|0.61
|align="right"|+0.2
|- bgcolor="white"
|align="right" colspan=3|Turnout
|align="right"|59,591
|align="right"|69.67
|align="right"|+7.7
|- bgcolor="white"

References

External links
David McGuinty's MP Website

1960 births
Alumni of the London School of Economics
Businesspeople from Ottawa
Canadian people of Irish descent
Lawyers in Ontario
Liberal Party of Canada MPs
Living people
Members of the House of Commons of Canada from Ontario
Members of the King's Privy Council for Canada
Politicians from Ottawa
Université de Sherbrooke alumni
University of Ottawa alumni
University of Ottawa Faculty of Law alumni
21st-century Canadian politicians